Goalundo Ghat (also spelled Goalanda and Goalondo) is a small town and pourasabha in Goalandaghat Upazila, Rajbari District, Dhaka Division, Bangladesh, South Asia. There are two railway stops one at Goalundo Ghat and one at Goalundo Bazar. The town has an area of 4.86 km2 and a population of 22,000 inhabitants (2001 estimate).

Historical significance
The Eastern Bengal Railway opened the line from Kolkata to Goalundo, on the southern bank of the Padma in 1871. Goalundo was for many years a major transportation hub for travel in eastern parts of Bengal and Assam. Here is a brief on the importance of Goalundo Ghat in earlier years:  “If one goes from Calcutta to Dacca the rail journey is broken at Goalundo and from there to Narayanganj is continued by steamer. The night mail from Calcutta deposits one at Goalundo in the early hours of the morning.  It is situated at the junction of the Padma, or Ganges, and the Brahmaputra, and daily services of steamers connect it with the railway systems at Narayanganj and Chandpur, and with the steamer services to Madaripur, Barisal, Sylhet, and Cachar. There are also daily services of steamers up the Padma to Digha Ghat , Patna in the dry season, and Buxar in the rains, and up the Brahmaputra to Dibrugarh. From that it will be seen that Goalundo occupies a very strong strategic position in the waterways of Bengal, a position which has been made much stronger by railway development."

Even after partition of India in 1947, the East Bengal Express ran up to 1964. That was the last direct link with Kolkata. The Goalundo Ghat railway link has since been used only for internal travel in Bangladesh.

Changing scenario
Bus/road travel has since gained primary importance in Bangladesh.  Most people use buses for travel from Dhaka and other places to Benapole and then cross over the border for links to Kolkata. For a long time road transport has been using the Daulatdia-Paturia ferry crossing nearby. The ferry also carries long-distance buses across the Padma.

The Government of Bangladesh has invited in November 2011 international tenders for the construction of the 6.1 km long second bridge across the Padma connecting Paturia and Daulatdia on a public-private partnership basis at a cost of 2 billion dollars.

References

External links

 Goalonda Ghat in Encyclopædia Britannica

Populated places in Dhaka Division